Isabelle Boéri-Bégard (born 7 July 1960) is a French fencer. She won a gold medal in the women's team foil event at the 1980 Summer Olympics.

References

External links
 

1960 births
Living people
French female foil fencers
Olympic fencers of France
Fencers at the 1980 Summer Olympics
Olympic gold medalists for France
Olympic medalists in fencing
Fencers from Paris
Medalists at the 1980 Summer Olympics
20th-century French women